Víctor Alfonso Sepúlveda Torres (3 April 1939 – 12 August 2021) was a Chilean professional footballer who played as a midfielder.

Club career
Born in Santiago, Sepúlveda began his career with Universidad de Chile, scoring 14 goals in 138 games for the club between 1959 and 1964, which included winning three national championships. He later played for Unión Española and Huachipato. He also earned 4 international caps for the Chile national team.

Coaching career
In his coaching career, he is better known by managed Unión La Calera on differents steps, having gotten promotion to the Chilean Primera División after winning the 1984 Segunda División de Chile. In addition, he coached Deportes La Serena, Deportes Antofagasta and Deportes Puerto Montt in Chile and The Strongest in Bolivia.

Personal life
He was nicknamed Chepo.

Since 1999 he made his home in Nogales, Chile, spending time as a football commentator for the local radio Radio La Calera. He died in a nursing home in Viña del Mar from heart failure, aged 82.

References

1939 births
2021 deaths
Footballers from Santiago
Chilean footballers
Chile international footballers
Universidad de Chile footballers
Unión Española footballers
C.D. Huachipato footballers
Chilean Primera División players
Association football midfielders
Chilean football managers
Chilean expatriate football managers
The Strongest managers
Deportes La Serena managers
Unión La Calera managers
Deportes Antofagasta managers
Deportes Puerto Montt managers
Bolivian Primera División managers
Primera B de Chile managers
Chilean Primera División managers
Chilean expatriate sportspeople in Bolivia
Expatriate football managers in Bolivia
Chilean association football commentators